West Caribbean Airways Flight 9955 was a scheduled flight between Isla de Providencia and San Andres Island, Colombia that crashed on 25 March 2005, killing 9 of the 14 passengers and crew on board.

Accident 
The aircraft, a Let L-410 Turbolet, had just taken off from El Embrujo Airport at 9:50, when the left engine flamed out. The crew continued with the takeoff, but the speed of the aircraft decreased rapidly. The aircraft then banked dangerously too far to the right and stalled. The aircraft crashed into a mangrove forest, located just  from the airport runway.

Both pilots and 7 of the 12 passengers were killed in the crash. One passenger initially survived the crash, but succumbed to their injuries shortly after being rescued. The survivors were taken to hospitals in San Andrés and Bogotá.

Aftermath 
This crash further worsened the already critical situation that had been facing West Caribbean Airways. Only 5 months later, the airline suffered another fatal and even deadlier accident when on 16 August 2005, Flight 708, a McDonnell Douglas MD-82, crashed in Venezuela killing all 160 people on board. The airline ceased operations in October the same year.

See also 

 West Caribbean Airways Flight 708
 List of accidents and incidents involving the Let L-410 Turbolet

References 

Aviation accidents and incidents in 2005
Aviation accidents and incidents in Colombia
2005 in Colombia
March 2005 events in South America
Accidents and incidents involving the Let L-410 Turbolet
Airliner accidents and incidents caused by engine failure